Hilcorp is an American privately held energy exploration and production company. The company was founded in 1989. The company is headquartered in Texas, with operations in nine different states.

The company was co-founded by Jeffery Hildebrand in 1989. Hildebrand bought out his partner for sole ownership. Hildebrand stepped down as CEO in 2018, promoting CEO Greg Lalicker to the position.

Hilcorp is the largest privately held oil company in the US, by volume.

The company's strategy is to acquire declining facilities and get more production out of them. In 2020, the company bought BP's assets in Prudhoe Bay, Alaska, for $5.6 billion. About half of BP's employees in Alaska transitioned with the takeover. Exxon transferred operations in Point Thompson to Hilcorp in 2021 though it maintains a 60% ownership of the facilities.

The company owns the largest share of the Trans-Alaska Pipeline System, after purchasing BP's 49% stake in 2019.

Hilcorp notably paid all of its employees a $100,000 bonus in 2016, and paid a $75,000 bonus to every employee in 2021.

Environmental impact

Hilcorp is the largest methane emitter in the US oil and gas industry, emitting more than 140,000 metric tonnes of methane.

The Pennsylvania Department of Environmental Protection claimed in 2017 that Hilcorp's fracking operations in the state caused a chain of earthquakes in the prior year.

In April 2021, the Pipeline and Hazardous Materials Safety Administration ordered the company to repair and replace an under-sea section of the pipeline in the Cook Inlet.

References

Non-renewable resource companies established in 1989
Oil pipeline companies
Companies based in Houston
Oil companies of the United States
Energy companies established in 1989
Natural gas companies of the United States